James Lung Wai-man  is the chairman of the Southern Democratic Alliance, a political organisation in Hong Kong. 

In mid-May 2019, he was arrested on suspicion of production of child pornography and indecent assault. He was accused of fondling and taking videos of two victims, then aged three and six. In 2020, Lung pleaded guilty to seven offences and was sentenced to 32 months in prison.

Notes

Hong Kong people
Hong Kong politicians
Living people
1974 births
Hong Kong politicians convicted of crimes